Longquan is a city in Zhejiang, China.

Longquan may also refer to:
 Longquan celadon, type of green-glazed Chinese ceramic
 Longquan Monastery, Buddhist monastery in Haidian District, Beijing, China
 Shangjing Longquanfu or Longquan Prefecture, capital of Bohai/Palhae

Towns (龙泉镇)
 Longquan, Xintian (龙泉镇), a town of Xintian County, Hunan
 Longquan, Yantai, Shandong
 Longquan, Huguan County, Shanxi
 Longquan, Yanggao County, Shanxi
 Longquan, Xi County, Shanxi
 Longquan, Shenchi County, Shanxi

Township (龙泉乡)
 Longquan Township, Zuoquan County, Shanxi

Subdistricts (龙泉街道)
 Longquan Subdistrict, Zhuzhou, Hunan
 Longquan Subdistrict, Chengdu, Sichuan

Mountains
 Longquan Mountains, Sichuan

See also

Longquanyi District, one of the nine districts of Chengdu, Sichuan